Home of the Year is an Irish property reality television series which has been broadcast on RTÉ One since 2015.

Format 
The format of the series follows three judges visiting three different homes every week and each scoring them out of ten. At the end of each episode the house which has scored the most points advances to the final. After seven weeks, the seven winning houses are judged one last time with the overall winner announced at the end of the episode.

Judges 
Architect, Hugh Wallace is the only judge who has appeared in every single season of the show. Season one, saw Wallace joined by, architect, Declan O'Donnell and textiles and homeware designer, Helen James. Season two and three saw Wallace and O'Donnell return for a second and third year in a row. Interior designer, Deirdre Whelan replaced James as a judge. Season four saw Wallace and Whelan return for another series, O'Donnell left the show and was replaced by architect, Patrick Bradley. Season five and six had Wallace and Whelan judge once again, however, architect, Peter Crowley joined the panel. In season seven Wallace was the only judge to return. He was joined by, interior designer, Suzie McAdam and, architect, Amanda Bone. In 2022, Wallace and Bone returned for their eighth and second series, respectively, joined my new judge, interior designer, Sara Cosgrove.

Series overview

Celebrity Home of the Year

Since 2016 three one-off celebrity specials of the show have aired on RTÉ One with five celebrities taking part in each episode. As with the main series, each house was scored out of thirty. The homeowner with the highest score at the end of the episode was awarded €5,000 for a charity of their choice.

2016
The episode was broadcast on 28 December 2016.

Judges scores in the charts below (given in parentheses) are listed in this order from left to right: Hugh Wallace, Deirdre Whelan, Declan O'Donnell.

2018
The episode was broadcast on 2 January 2018.

Judges scores in the charts below (given in parentheses) are listed in this order from left to right: Hugh Wallace, Deirdre Whelan, Patrick Bradley.

2019
The episode was broadcast on 2 January 2019.

Judges scores in the charts below (given in parentheses) are listed in this order from left to right: Hugh Wallace, Deirdre Whelan, Peter Crowley.

References

External links
 

2015 Irish television series debuts
Irish reality television series
RTÉ original programming